"Sewn" is the first properly released single of British rock group the Feeling, following the 7-inch only single "Fill My Little World" (which would later become a full single release itself). It was released in the UK on 27 February 2006 and entered the UK Singles Chart at  7 on 5 March 2006. "Sewn" gained the band a lot of support and went on to become one of the most successful songs of the year on British radio, with Chris Moyles of BBC Radio 1 championing the band. 

The single was recorded in sibling band members Kevin and Ciaran Jeremiah's dad's shed, known as "Kevin and Ciaran's mum and dad's outbuilding". Four Stops and Home, the Feeling's debut release for American audiences, incorporates "Sewn" as its leading track as well as its single artwork. In August 2006, on the USA's iTunes Store, "Sewn" was a single of the week.

Music video
The music video of Sewn contains the band members playing the song as they are getting wrapped up in cords, wires and ropes.

Track listings
UK CD single
 "Sewn" – 5:57
 "Sun Is Shining" – 3:06
 "When I Return" – 4:06

7-inch single
A. "Sewn" – 5:57
B. "Funny Cigarette" – 3:06

Digital download
 "Sewn" (radio edit) – 3:45

Charts

Weekly charts

Year-end charts

References

2006 singles
2006 songs
The Feeling songs
Island Records singles
LGBT-related songs
Songs written by Ciaran Jeremiah
Songs written by Dan Gillespie Sells
Songs written by Kevin Jeremiah
Songs written by Paul Stewart (musician)
Songs written by Richard Jones (The Feeling)